Platte County is a county located in the U.S. state of Nebraska. As of the 2010 United States Census, the population was 32,237. Its county seat is Columbus. The county was created in 1855.

Platte County comprises the Columbus, NE Micropolitan Statistical Area.

In the Nebraska license plate system, Platte County is represented by the prefix 10 (it had the 10th-largest number of vehicles registered in the state when the license plate system was established in 1922).

History 
Platte County was officially established in 1856 and the board of commissioners had its first meeting the following year.

Platte County had its first presumptive case of COVID-19 in late March 2020. As of Oct. 3, 2021, one in seven residents of the county have tested positive for COVID-19 and 40% of all residents are vaccinated.

Geography
The Platte River flows eastward along the south line of Platte County. The Loup River also flows eastward and east-southeastward through the lower section of the county, discharging into the Platte River near Columbus. The Platte County terrain consists of low rolling hills, largely devoted to agriculture, sloping to the east-southeast.

Major highways

  U.S. Highway 30
  U.S. Highway 81
  Nebraska Highway 22
  Nebraska Highway 39
  Nebraska Highway 45
  Nebraska Highway 91

Adjacent counties

 Colfax County – east
 Butler County – southeast
 Polk County – south
 Merrick County – south
 Nance County – southwest
 Boone County – west
 Madison County – north
 Stanton County – northeast

Protected areas
 George Syas State Wildlife Management Area

Demographics

As of the 2000 United States Census, there were 31,662 people, 12,076 households, and 8,465 families in the county. The population density was 47 people per square mile (18/km2). There were 12,916 housing units at an average density of 19 per square mile (7/km2). The racial makeup of the county was 94.29% White, 0.35% Black or African American, 0.28% Native American, 0.40% Asian, 0.03% Pacific Islander, 3.49% from other races, and 1.15% from two or more races. 6.54% of the population were Hispanic or Latino of any race.

There were 12,076 households, out of which 36.10% had children under the age of 18 living with them, 59.20% were married couples living together, 7.60% had a female householder with no husband present, and 29.90% were non-families. 25.90% of all households were made up of individuals, and 11.40% had someone living alone who was 65 years of age or older. The average household size was 2.59 and the average family size was 3.14.

The county population contained 29.00% under the age of 18, 8.10% from 18 to 24, 27.50% from 25 to 44, 21.60% from 45 to 64, and 13.80% who were 65 years of age or older. The median age was 36 years. For every 100 females there were 98.40 males. For every 100 females age 18 and over, there were 95.60 males.

The median income for a household in the county was $39,359, and the median income for a family was $47,776. Males had a median income of $30,672 versus $21,842 for females. The per capita income for the county was $18,064. About 5.40% of families and 7.70% of the population were below the poverty line, including 9.00% of those under age 18 and 6.80% of those age 65 or over.

Communities

Cities
 Columbus (county seat)
 Humphrey
 Newman Grove (part)

Villages

 Cornlea
 Creston
 Duncan
 Lindsay
 Monroe
 Platte Center
 Tarnov

Census-designated place
 Lakeview

Other unincorporated communities

 Oconee
 Rosenborg
 Saint Bernard
 Tracy Valley

Townships

 Bismark
 Burrows
 Butler
 Columbus
 Creston
 Grand Prairie
 Granville
 Humphrey
 Joliet
 Lost Creek
 Loup
 Monroe
 Oconee
 St. Bernard
 Shell Creek
 Sherman
 Walker
 Woodville

Notable people
 James Keogh, executive editor of Time magazine and the head of the White House speechwriting staff under Richard M. Nixon

Politics
Platte County voters have been reliably Republican for decades. In only one election since 1936 has the county selected the Democratic Party candidate.

See also
 National Register of Historic Places listings in Platte County, Nebraska

References

 
1855 establishments in Nebraska Territory
Populated places established in 1855